James Edward Boyd (September 9, 1834April 30, 1906) was an Irish-born American businessman and politician in early Omaha, Nebraska. The founder of Boyd's Packing House and Boyd's Theater and Opera House, he served as the Mayor of Omaha from 1881 to 1883 and from 1885 to 1887, and as the seventh Governor of the state of Nebraska in 1891 and from 18921893.

Early life
Boyd was born in County Tyrone, Ireland, on September 9, 1834. He moved to Belmont County, Ohio, with his family in 1844.  His education was in the common schools. As he grew older, James and his brother, Joseph Boyd, managed the Boyd Ranch just west of Gibbon, Nebraska, and eventually married Anna Henry, an army doctor stationed at Fort Kearny, on August 22, 1858. The Boyd ranch served as a stopping point for travelers moving out west along the Oregon and Mormon Trails. Travelers who had tired or worn out horses or oxen could trade for well-rested animals capable of pulling the large wagons across the Nebraska Prairie. As the Ranch business started to plummet, Joseph, sold his share of the ranching enterprise to James who then invested in 24 mule teams and other pieces of equipment to start a freight business. Among the first freight brought out from Missouri was lumber for a new ranch house, built between 1864 and 1868, at the Trails and Rails Museum today. While his two previous business enterprises made the Boyd Ranch well known across the state and the country, James secured a contract with the Union Pacific to build 300 miles of track. As a result of this contract, the James Boyd family became very wealthy and lead him to many more endeavors.

Career
After a move to Omaha, Nebraska Territory, in 1856, he continued to support himself with his carpentry.
A member of the Democratic Party, Boyd served in the Nebraska House of Representatives in 1866.

In 1881, Boyd built Boyd's Opera House at 15th and Farnam Streets in Downtown Omaha.  When the building burned in 1891, Boyd quickly rebuilt a new 2,000-seat theater and opera house at 17th and Harney Streets.  The new five-story structure, Boyd's Theater and Opera House, opened to the public on September 3, 1891.   Until it was demolished in 1920, it hosted some of the most celebrated actors of the stage.

Boyd was mayor of Omaha, Nebraska, from 1881 to 1883, and from 1885 to 1887. He was the first Democrat elected as Nebraska's governor and served in that position in 1891, and from 1892 to 1893.

His opponent in his election for Governor, John H. Powers, disputed the results of the election. While Boyd won by a margin of 1144 votes, Powers claimed to have evidence that "2000 persons were bribed in Douglas County to vote for Boyd." A resolution to investigate these allegations was introduced, but was ruled out of order.

Death and legacy
Boyd died in Omaha, Nebraska, on April 30, 1906, and he is interred at Forest Lawn Memorial Park, Omaha, Douglas County, Nebraska.

Boyd County, Nebraska, is named after Boyd.  Boyd Elementary School, part of the Omaha Public School system is also named for him, as well as Boyd Street that runs along the south side of the school's property.

From 1885 to 1890, Boyd's portrait was painted in Omaha by artist Herbert A. Collins.

See also

List of U.S. state governors born outside the United States

References

External links

National Governors Association
Political Graveyard

1834 births
1906 deaths
American people of Scotch-Irish descent
Democratic Party members of the Nebraska House of Representatives
Democratic Party governors of Nebraska
Businesspeople from Omaha, Nebraska
Mayors of Omaha, Nebraska
Irish emigrants to the United States (before 1923)
Meatpacking industry in Omaha, Nebraska
19th-century American politicians
19th-century American businesspeople